A monarch is the head of a monarchy, a form of government in which a state is ruled by an individual who normally rules for life or until abdication, and typically inherits the throne by birth. Monarchs may be autocrats (as in all absolute monarchies) or may be ceremonial figureheads, exercising only limited or no reserve powers at all, with actual authority vested in a legislature and/or executive cabinet (as in many constitutional monarchies). In many cases, a monarch will also be linked with a state religion. Most states only have a single monarch at any given time, although a regent may rule when the monarch is a minor, not present, or otherwise incapable of ruling. Cases in which two monarchs rule simultaneously over a single state, as is the current situation in Andorra, are known as coregencies.

A variety of titles are applied in English; for example, "king" and "queen", "prince" and "princess", "emperor" and "empress". Although they will be addressed differently in their local languages, the names and titles in the list below have been styled using the common English equivalent. Roman numerals, used to distinguish related rulers with the same name, have been applied where typical.

In political and sociocultural studies, monarchies are normally associated with hereditary rule; most monarchs, in both historical and contemporary contexts, have been born and raised within a royal family. Succession has been defined using a variety of distinct formulae, such as proximity of blood, primogeniture, and agnatic seniority. Some monarchies, however, are not hereditary, and the ruler is instead determined through an elective process; a modern example is the throne of Malaysia. These systems defy the model concept of a monarchy, but are commonly considered as such because they retain certain associative characteristics. Many systems use a combination of hereditary and elective elements, where the election or nomination of a successor is restricted to members of a royal bloodline.

Entries below are listed beside their respective dominions, which are organised alphabetically. These monarchs reign as head of state in their respective sovereign states. Monarchs reigning over a constituent division, cultural or traditional polity are listed under constituent monarchs. For a list of former ruling families or abolished thrones, see: former ruling families.

Monarchs by country

See also
 List of current reigning monarchs by length of reign
 List of current non-sovereign monarchs
 List of current heads of state and government
 Heads of former ruling families
 List of monarchies
 List of living former sovereign monarchs
 List of current heirs apparent
 List of current consorts of sovereigns
 Records of heads of state

Notes

References

External links

Monarchs
Sovereign